Cross Creek Cemetery is a cemetery located in Fayetteville, North Carolina, near a creek of that name that "meanders for more than a mile from downtown Fayetteville to the Cape Fear River."  It was established in 1785. The cemetery is organized into five numbered sections and is managed by a cemetery office within Fayetteville–Cumberland County Parks & Recreation.

History
The original section, known as Cross Creek Cemetery Number One was established in 1785 and expanded in 1833. It contains approximately 1,170 gravemarkers dating from 1786 to 1964.This cemetery is the oldest cemetery in Fayetteville.

After the Civil War ended, the Ladies' Memorial Association of Fayetteville had all soldiers who had been killed in battle—along with those who had died and been buried in various nearby locations—interred (or re-interred) in Cross Creek Cemetery.  The group then raised the funds to erect a Confederate Soldiers Monument in Cross Creek, the first Confederate monument in North Carolina; it was dedicated on December 30, 1868.

In 1915, the Cross Creek Cemetery Commission was created via an act of the North Carolina General Assembly, providing for the maintenance of the cemetery.

Cross Creek Cemetery #1 was added to the National Register of Historic Places in September 1998 as a national historic district. In June 2010, "more than fifty headstones were damaged and in disarray" in Cross Creek Cemetery #1, following a report of vandalism.

Notable burials
Politicians
 J. Bayard Clark, United States Representative (1929–49)
 James C. Dobbin, United States Secretary of the Navy (1853–57)
 Wharton J. Green, United States Representative (1883–87)
 Edward J. Hale, United States Ambassador to Costa Rica (1913–17)
 John G. Shaw, United States Representative (1895–1897)
 Charles Manly Stedman, Lieutenant Governor of North Carolina (1885–89) and United States Representative (1911–30)
 Warren Winslow, Speaker of the North Carolina Senate (1854–55) and United States Representative (1855–61)
Others
 Robert Adam (1759–1801), merchant and first captain of the Fayetteville Independent Light Infantry
 Elliot Daingerfield (1859–1932), artist

References

External links 
 Photographs of Cross Creek Cemetery from the NCSU Libraries
 

Geography of Fayetteville, North Carolina
Cemeteries on the National Register of Historic Places in North Carolina
Confederate States of America cemeteries
1785 establishments in North Carolina
Geography of Cumberland County, North Carolina
National Register of Historic Places in Cumberland County, North Carolina
Historic districts on the National Register of Historic Places in North Carolina